NASPA Word List (NWL, formerly Official Tournament and Club Word List, referred to as OTCWL, OWL, TWL) is the official word authority for tournament Scrabble in the USA and Canada under the aegis of NASPA Games. It is based on the Official Scrabble Players Dictionary (OSPD) with modifications to make it more suitable for tournament play. Its British and international-English counterpart is Collins Scrabble Words.

Current edition

North American tournament Scrabble currently uses the fifth edition of NWL (officially NWL2020, but variously called OWL5, OTCWL2020, TWL5, and TWL2020). The NASPA Games Dictionary Committee created this version in mid-2020 and it took effect on January 6, 2021; it is the second version published autonomously by NASPA rather than by Merriam-Webster under its copyright.

NWL2020 contains every word in the sixth edition of the Official Scrabble Players Dictionary as well as words considered unsuitable for that book (offensive words and trademarks). It also contains words of nine or more letters, unlike the OSPD. It differs from its predecessor, NWL2018, only in the removal of 259 words deemed to be personally applicable offensive slurs, precipitated by rule changes proposed by the North American holder of SCRABBLE trademarks, Hasbro, Inc., in the wake of that year's anti-racism protests.

Past editions

The decision to bowdlerize the OSPD's third edition by removing a large number of possibly offensive words necessitated a separate, unabridged word list for tournament use. The first edition of OWL was created by the NSA Dictionary Committee, chaired by John Chew, and took effect on March 2, 1998. To avoid controversy, it was available for sale only to NSA members, and unlike the OSPD, did not include definitions. To provide additional value for tournament players, the OWL includes words whose base or inflected forms have up to nine letters, rather than the OSPD's eight. OSPD3 was created from OSPD2 by adding all appropriate words that had been added to Merriam-Webster's Collegiate Dictionary (MWCD) in the interim; OWL was then formed by restoring the possibly offensive words removed from OSPD3 and adding nine-letter words from MWCD. The 2014 update (OTCWL2014, also known as OWL3) added several thousand words from two new sources, Oxford Collegiate Dictionary Second Edition (OCD2) and Canadian Oxford Dictionary Second Edition (COD2). A minor update in 2016 (OTCWL2016, also known as OWL3.1) added over 1,000 nine-letter words. The 2018 update (NWL2018, or OWL4) added over 3,000 words, including additions to OSPD6 and MWCD, and ten-letter words from COD2. It was produced by NASPA in collaboration with Merriam-Webster, but, for the first time, under its own copyright.

Other word authorities
Unlike the Official Scrabble Players Dictionary, NWL is a list and does not include definitions. It contains words not included in OSPD because they are considered offensive, and a number of other additional words (mostly registered trademarks). Print versions of NWL can be procured from the NASPA website by NASPA members only.

Word count

See also
Official Scrabble Players Dictionary
Collins Scrabble Words

References

External links

 Information on the NASPA Word List 2018 Edition at NASPA

Lists of English words
Scrabble lexica